Blampied is a town in the central highlands of Victoria on the Midland Highway.

The town was named after Louis Blampied who built a hotel here which is now called the Swiss Mountain Inn.

Blampied Post Office opened on 20 November 1879 and closed in 1971.

References

Towns in Victoria (Australia)